The Copa Federação Matogrossense de Futebol, also known as Copa FMF, is a tournament organized by Federação Matogrossense de Futebol every second half of the season.

The tournament was also previously called Copa Governador de Mato Grosso and Copa Mato Grosso before changing to the current name in 2017.

List of champions

Titles by team
Luverdense  4 titles
Cuiabá, Mixto and União Rondonópolis 2 titles
Araguaia, Cacerense, Dom Bosco, Nova Mutum, Operário, Rondonópolis, and Vila Aurora 1 title

References

External links
List of champions at RSSSF Brasil

Football in Mato Grosso
Recurring sporting events established in 2004